George Simon (born March 14, 1942) is a retired athlete from Trinidad and Tobago, born in St. George's, Grenada.

Achievements

References

 

1942 births
Living people
People from St. George's, Grenada
Trinidad and Tobago male sprinters
Athletes (track and field) at the 1968 Summer Olympics
Olympic athletes of Trinidad and Tobago
Athletes (track and field) at the 1967 Pan American Games
Pan American Games competitors for Trinidad and Tobago
Competitors at the 1970 Central American and Caribbean Games
Grenadian emigrants to Trinidad and Tobago